Tiffin: 500 Authentic Recipes Celebrating India's Regional Cuisine is the cookbook written by Sonal Ved and published by Roli Books in 2018. Book consists recipes of Indian cuisine and is divided regionally in many parts.

Synopsis 
Tiffin consists 500 recipes of the Indian cuisine and hyper-regionally divided. It includes recipes of the temple cuisines, street foods, tribal dishes and many other dishes which are not commonly used. For the book, author has taken the help of her mother, grandmother, friends, aunts and many other people who know India's regional cooking.

Reception 
Tiffin was listed under "19 best cookbooks of fall 2018" by The New York Times. Hindustan Times listed the book under "most interesting books of the week" on 19 October 2018.

Tanu Ganguly, over the review in NDTV, has praised the work and called it as "must read" book. According to them, the book, "if enjoyed the way it is intended to, should serve the purpose of transporting you hundreds of kilometres away from your own home, into the kitchens of fellow Indians, where food is equally tasty, wholesome and heart-warming".

Aatish Nath, writing for Indian fashion magazine Vogue India, has also praised the work and wrote that author was meticulous to ensure that every recipe includes exact formulations.

References 

Cookbooks
2018 non-fiction books
Indian cuisine
Roli Books books